Fairmount Mausoleum is a public mausoleum at Fairmount Cemetery in Denver, Colorado. The building was designed by architects Frederick E. Mountjoy and Francis W. Frewan. Constructed in 1929 and opened in 1930, the Fairmount Mausoleum contains the remains of more than 17,000 people and houses one of the largest stained glass collections in the state of Colorado.

In 2005, the Fairmount Mausoleum was listed as an official historic landmark by the City of Denver.

Notable interments 
 Charles Boettcher (1852–1948) businessman and philanthropist
 Frederick Gilmer Bonfils (1860–1933) co-founder of The Denver Post
 Helen Bonfils (1889–1972) businesswoman and philanthropist
 Charles Gates, Sr. (1877–1961) founder of Gates Rubber Company
 Edwin C. Johnson (1884–1970) Colorado Governor and U.S. Senator
 William Lee Knous (1889–1959) Colorado Governor
 Donald Meek (1878–1946) popular character actor
 Eugene Donald Millikin (1891–1958) U.S. Senator
 Frederick E. Mountjoy (1870–1941) architect, co-designer of the Fairmount Mausoleum
 Lawrence Cowle Phipps (1862–1958) U.S. Senator
 Florence Rena Sabin (1871–1953) American medical scientist
 Karl Cortlandt Schuyler (1877–1933) U.S. Senator
 George Somnes (1887–1956) theatre and film director and producer, husband of Helen Bonfils

References

External links 
 Fairmount Heritage Foundation
  

Death in Colorado
Buildings and structures completed in 1930
Burials at Fairmount Cemetery (Denver, Colorado)
Mausoleums in the United States
1930 establishments in Colorado
Buildings and structures in Denver